Bazaria nomiella is a species of snout moth in the genus Bazaria. It was described by Émile Louis Ragonot in 1887, and is known from Transcaucasia.

References

Moths described in 1887
Phycitini
Moths of Asia
Taxa named by Émile Louis Ragonot